Ryukyuan Americans are Americans who are fully or partially of Ryukyuan descent. The vast majority of them trace their family history to the Okinawa Islands.

History

Immigration 
The first Ryukyuans to migrate to the United States were 26 Okinawan contract laborers led by Kyuzo Toyama. They arrived at the Territory of Hawaii on January 8, 1900, in order to work on the sugar plantations there.

In the following years, more Ryukyuans (mainly Okinawans) started to settle in Hawaii. Some of them would end up migrating to the continental U.S., with higher concentrations of them living on the West Coast.

Culture

Identity 
A lot of Ryukyuan Americans view themselves to be distinct from the Japanese. This is especially true in Hawaii, where there are numerous Okinawan organizations, the largest one being the Hawaii United Okinawa Association.

Language 

The vast majority of Ryukyuan Americans speak English and Japanese as a first language. There are also some who can speak one of the many Ryukyuan languages, with the most common one being Okinawan. In Hawaii, many Okinawan locals speak an English-based creole language known as Hawaiian Pidgin.

Notable Ryukyuan Americans

Politician
Denny Tamaki

Singer
Olivia Lufkin

References 

Ryukyuan people
Japanese people
American people of Japanese descent
American people of Okinawan descent
Asian-American society